The San Diego State Aztecs college football team represent San Diego State University in the Mountain West Conference. The Aztecs competed in the National Collegiate Athletic Association (NCAA) College Division in the years 1921–1968. In 1969, the team moved to National Collegiate Athletic Association (NCAA) Division I.

The program has had 18 head coaches in its 97 seasons of existence. Don Coryell is the coach with the highest winning percentage (.840) and most wins (104) of any San Diego State coaches. He was inducted into the College Football Hall of Fame in 1999. From a perspective of Bowl appearances, the former coach Rocky Long has been the most successful and has led the Aztecs to a Bowl game in each of his nine years as head coach.

Coaches 

† No team in 1943–44

Through December 22, 2019.

References

San Diego State Aztecs

San Diego State Aztecs football
San Diego State Aztecs football coaches